The Crocodile Zoo is a zoo on the Danish island of Falster. It is located just to the southwest of Gundslevmagle, northeast of Eskilstrup, towards the northern centre of the island. Established in 2000, the zoo has the world's largest collection of crocodilians (crocodiles and relatives) with all 23 existing species (same as St. Augustine Alligator Farm Zoological Park). This includes the only Orinoco crocodiles outside the Americas, which are part of a breeding program involving US zoos and the Venezuelan government.

History
Founded by Rene Hedegaard, it is the largest museum of its kind in Europe. Developed in cooperation with Bøgecentret, the museum opened to the public in June 2000.

Exhibits
Although the exterior of the zoo is not striking, located at an old farm in the countryside, its exhibits are more impressive. It provides a good opportunity to see the difference between crocodiles, alligators and all the other species. Crocodiles are inactive most of the time but with so many variants, at least one of them is likely to be active during a visit. A portion of each sold admission ticket is contributed towards conservation projects conducted by the Crocodile Specialist Group. All crocodiles in the zoo come from prior captivity. All the larger crocodiles are housed in well designed surroundings with plants and artificial cliffs which they share with turtles and lizards. The smaller species have spacious terrariums at their disposal, allowing them to be seen close up. Crocodile Zoo participates in several breeding programs, and coordinates the European programs for the black caiman and Philippine crocodile.

The visit starts with the huge Nile crocodiles and the slightly smaller gharials, before proceeding down a long corridor lined with crocodiles on either side. At the far end, there is a pit with large turtles. Around the walls there are smaller terriums with other reptiles such as snakes, including a green anaconda. The visit ends in a small tropical house where large alligators can be seen from a footbridge. There are red lories, green iguanas, and marmosets as well as small terrariums for baby crocodiles and alligators.

References

External links
Krokodille Zoo site in English

Buildings and structures in Falster
Zoos in Denmark
Tourist attractions in Denmark